Ludwika Maria Róża Rzewuska (1744–1816) was a Polish Szlachta and writer.

She was the youngest daughter of Wacław Rzewuski and Anna Lubomirska. On 1 January 1766, she married Jan Mikołaj Chodkiewicz in Podhorce (Pidhirtsi).

She wrote instructions concerning the care, education and safety of her children, which are important sources. These instructions were discussed in academic literature.

In 1806 she bought Jampol from Dominik Zasławski.

Footnotes

References
https://apcz.umk.pl/KLIO/article/view/37532/33659
https://www.ipsb.nina.gov.pl/a/biografia/waclaw-rzewuski-1706-1779-kaszt-krakowski-hetman-wielki-koronny

1744 births
1816 deaths
18th-century Polish–Lithuanian writers
Maria Ludwika
18th-century Polish nobility
19th-century Polish landowners